Clément René Bistagne (14 March 1914 – 16 October 1967) was a French racing cyclist. He rode in the 1935 Tour de France.

Bistagne was a resistance member during the Second World War.

References

External links
 

1914 births
1967 deaths
French male cyclists
Cyclists from Marseille
French Resistance members